Lucas Coutinho (born 12 August 1996) is a Brazilian footballer who plays as a midfielder for Greenville Triumph in the USL League One.

References

External links
 
 Profile at PBA Athletics

1996 births
Living people
Brazilian footballers
Brazilian expatriate footballers
Brazilian expatriate sportspeople in the United States
Association football midfielders
Expatriate soccer players in the United States
Florida Tropics SC players
Lakeland Tropics players
Major Arena Soccer League players
Ocala Stampede players
Sportspeople from Recife
South Florida Surf players
Tormenta FC players
USL League One players
USL League Two players
Palm Beach Atlantic Sailfish men's soccer players
FC Tulsa players
Greenville Triumph SC players